Koyee [कोयी] is a Sino-Tibetan language belonging to the Kiranti languages spoken in the Khotang district of Nepal. Like other Kiranti languages, it displays a fairly complex system of person-marking and stem alternations. No full description of this language exists, but Lahaussois provides some grammatical information, and stories have been archived at the Lacito Archive.

Alternate spellings and names are Kohi, Koi B.ʌʔ’, Koyee, Koyi, Koyu.

Geographical distribution
Koyee is spoken in Sungdel (near Rawakhola headwaters) and Dipsung VDC's, northeastern Khotang District, Koshi Province, Nepal (Ethnologue).

References

Bibliography
Lahaussois, Aimée. 2009. 'Koyi Rai: An Initial Grammatical Sketch.' Himalayan Linguistics Archive 4. 1-33.
http://lacito.vjf.cnrs.fr/archivage/languages/Koyi_Rai.htm
Rai, Tara Mani.2022. A Grammar of Koyee,LINCOM EUROPA.https://www.amazon.de/Grammar-Koyee-Tara-Mani-Rai/dp/3969391121
Rai,Tara Mani.2015. A Grammar of Koyee. A PhD dissertation submitted to Tribhuvan University, Nepal.
Rai, Tara Mani and Omkareshor Shrestha.2014. http://cdltu.edu.np/site/images/linsun/koyee.pdf
Rai,Tara Mani.2012. Nepalese Linguistics - Table of Contents - Digital Himalayahttp://www.digitalhimalaya.com › nepling › nepling_toc

Kiranti languages

Languages of Nepal
Languages of Koshi Province